John Ogden may refer to:

John Ogden (colonist) (1609-1682), an American colonial leader
John Ogden (actor) (died 1732), a British stage actor
John B. Ogden (1812–?), 19th century Arkansas judge
John Ogden (academic), co-founder of Fisk University, Nashville, in 1866
John William Ogden (1860s-1930), British trade unionist
Jack Ogden (1897–1977), baseball player
John Ogden (photographer) (graduated 1979), Australian photographer and cinematographer
 John Ogden (ecologist), New Zealand ecologist, botanist and Fellow of the Royal Society Te Apārangi
Jon Ogden (born 1974), American footballer

See also
John Ogdon (1937–1989), pianist